The 2020 Adelaide 500 (known for commercial reasons as the 2020 Superloop Adelaide 500) is a motor racing event for the Supercars Championship held on Thursday 20 February through to Sunday 23 February 2020. The event was held at the Adelaide Street Circuit in Adelaide, South Australia, and marked the twenty-second running of the Adelaide 500. It was the first event of fourteen in the 2020 Supercars Championship and consisted of two races of 250 kilometres.

The race was supported by the opening rounds of the Super2 Series, Porsche Carrera Cup Australia, Touring Car Masters, Boost Mobile Super Trucks and National TA2 Series.

Results

Practice

Race 1

Qualifying

Race

Race 2

Qualifying

Race

References

External links

Adelaide 500
Adelaide 500
Adelaide 500